The Computer Wore Tennis Shoes is a 1995 American made-for-television science fiction comedy film directed by Peyton Reed (in his feature directorial debut) and written by Joseph L. McEveety and Ryan Rowe. The film is a remake of the 1969 film of the same name. It premiered on ABC as an ABC Family Movie on February 18, 1995. It is the second in a series of four remakes of Disney live-action films produced for broadcast on the network during the 1994–95 television season, the other three being The Shaggy Dog, Escape to Witch Mountain, and Freaky Friday.

The film stars Kirk Cameron in the lead role of Dexter Riley, a boy who becomes an instant genius, wired directly into the Internet. The film also co-stars Larry Miller and Dean Jones plays the role of an evil dean from a competing school.

Cast

Cast as listed in end credits

Uncredited
 Julia Sweeney (television reporter)

Reception
Variety gave the film a moderately positive review, calling it an "utterly silly yarn" that "lacks the zaniness of the original", and complimented Larry Miller's performance. People gave it a B+ rating and called it a "fun, facile remake" with a good cast.

References

External links 
 
 

1995 television films
1995 films
1990s science fiction comedy films
American science fiction comedy films
Remakes of American films
Disney television films
Disney film remakes
Walt Disney anthology television series episodes
1990s English-language films
Films about computing
Films directed by Peyton Reed
Medfield College films
Television remakes of films
1990s American films